Leo Dietrich Franz Reichsfreiherr Geyr von Schweppenburg (2 March 1886 – 27 January 1974), was a German general during World War II, noted for his pioneering stance and expertise in the field of armoured warfare.
He commanded the 5th Panzer Army (formalised as Panzer Group West) during the Invasion of Normandy, and later served as  Inspector General of Armoured Troops. After the war he was involved in the development of the newly built German Army (Bundeswehr).

Early life and career 
Freiherr von Geyr was born 1886 in Potsdam into the Prussian military aristocracy and descended from a family that produced two Prussian Field Marshals. He joined the German Army in 1904. In World War I he fought on several fronts and rose to the rank of captain. After the war, he remained in the army, becoming an Oberst in 1932, and a Generalmajor in 1935. From 1933 to 1937, he was a military attaché to the United Kingdom, Belgium and the Netherlands, residing in London. Promoted to Generalleutnant upon his return from London, he took command of the 3rd Panzer (armoured) Division in 1937.

World War II 
From 1 September – 7 October 1939 Geyr commanded the 3rd Panzer Division during the invasion of Poland, where it was the most numerically powerful Panzer Division, with 391 tanks. For a victory at Kulm, he was praised on the battlefield by Hitler who had visited the division in recognition for its achievements in Poland. He was promoted to General der Kavallerie of the XXIV Panzer Corps on 15 February 1940. In 1940 he commanded the XXIV Panzer Corps in the Invasion of France. In 1941, in the invasion of the Soviet Union, Geyr’s XXIV Panzer Corps was part of General Heinz Guderian’s Second Panzer Army, and consisted of all of Guderian's major tank units. On 9 July 1941, he was awarded the Knight's Cross of the Iron Cross as General der Panzertruppe. By early November 1941, Geyr's Panzer Corps commanded the 3rd, 4th, and 17th Panzer Divisions, the panzer regiment from the 18th Panzer Division, as well as the Infantry Regiment Großdeutschland, and spearheaded the advance of Army Group Centre during the Battle of Moscow.

From 21 July 1942, taking over from the court-martialed Georg Stumme, to 30 September 1942, he was commanding General of the XXXX Panzer Corps, taking part in the fighting in the Caucasus.  Geyr was relieved in a command cadre shakeup at the end of September 1942.

In the spring of 1943 Field Marshal Gerd von Rundstedt ordered Geyr to prepare a force of 10 Panzer and motorised infantry divisions. On 19 November 1943 Geyr's command was formalised as Panzer Group West, which had responsibility for the training and formation of all armoured units in the west. This group of armoured divisions near Paris constituted the Germans’ main force of tanks in France. In the event of an Allied landing on the northern French coast, Panzer Group West was expected to counterattack northward and halt the invasion force.

The Allied invasion of Normandy took place on 6 June 1944. By 8 June Geyr moved three panzer divisions northward against British and Canadian forces advancing on the town of Caen.

On 10 June 1944, Royal Air Force aircraft attacked his newly established headquarters at La Caine in Normandy. Geyr was wounded and many of his staff officers were killed, forcing the cancellation of the counterattack.

Geyr’s reinforced tank units managed to prevent the British advance for another month, but he was nevertheless relieved of his command on 2 July, after seconding Rundstedt’s request that Hitler authorize a strategic withdrawal from Caen. He was succeeded by Heinrich Eberbach on 4 July and served as  Inspector General of Armoured Troops  until the closing phase of the war.

Post-war 

Between 1945 and 1947, Geyr was in American captivity. He participated in the work of the U.S. Army Historical Division, where, under the guidance of Franz Halder, German generals wrote World War II operational studies for the U.S. Army, first as POWs and then as employees. After his release Geyr wrote a memoir of his years in London as a military attaché, Erinnerungen eines Militärattachés, London 1933–1937 (1949), which was translated and published along with additional material covering his life through World War II as The Critical Years (1952). During the early 1950s Geyr was involved in both the development and creation of the newly built German Army (Bundeswehr) of West Germany. 
Geyr died in Irschenhausen near Munich. He was married to Anais Krausse (22 July 1890, Ludwigsburg - 6 November 1960, Irschenhausen). Their daughter Blanche Freiin Geyr von Schweppenburg (24 March 1918 - 21 May 2003) was married to Curt-Christoph von Pfuel (2 September 1907, Berlin - 5 August 2000, Bonn), Prussian assessor, member of the Council of Europe, last Fideikommiss, Lord of Jahnsfelde.

Works and memoirs 
 Pz Gp. West: Report of the Commander (1947)
 Erinnerungen eines Militarattachés: London 1933–1937 (Stuttgart: Deutsche Verlags-Anstalt, 1949)
 Die Verteidigung des Westens (Frankfurt: Verlag Friedrich Rudl, 1952)
 Die große Frage (Bernard & Graefe, 1952)
 The Critical Years, with foreword by Leslie Hore-Belisha (London: Allan Wingate, 1952)

Awards and decorations 

 Knight's Cross of the Iron Cross on 9 July 1941 as General der Panzertruppe and commander of XXIV. Armeekorps (motorized)

References 
Citations

Bibliography

 
 
 
 
 

1886 births
1974 deaths
German prisoners of war in World War II held by the United States
People from the Province of Brandenburg
Cavalry commanders
Generals of Panzer Troops
Barons of Germany
Recipients of the clasp to the Iron Cross, 1st class
German Army personnel of World War I
Recipients of the Knight's Cross of the Iron Cross
Military personnel of Württemberg
Reichswehr personnel
Recipients of the Order of Bravery, 4th class
German military attachés
20th-century German diplomats
Military personnel from Potsdam